Philip Proudfoot (born 28 November 1987) is an English anthropologist and politician. Born and raised in County Durham, he is the founder and, until 2022, the leader of the Northern Independence Party (NIP), which campaigns against what it sees as political and economic centralisation in the UK. It advocates that Northern England becomes an independent country under its historic name, "Northumbria". He also lectures in power and popular politics at the University of Sussex's Institute of Development Studies where he is a specialist in the Middle East, conflict and humanitarianism.

A former member of Labour Party, Proudfoot formed the NIP in response to Keir Starmer's leadership and what he sees as the treatment of the North during the COVID-19 pandemic. He told Big Issue North that the centralisation of power in London had played a part as well, highlighting the North–South divide in healthcare, transport, education, and general standard of living as motivating factors. He has said that, at the next general election, he hopes to stand for the NIP in Sedgefield, the former constituency of Tony Blair, should party members select him.

Proudfoot lives in Brighton and Hove, having moved there due to a lack of job opportunities in his field in County Durham. In response to critics wondering why someone living in the South of England would support Northern independence, he said that this is an issue which epitomises the North–South divide: younger people from the North of England having to leave their hometowns to find work in cities, predominantly in the South.

On 25 April 2022, the actress Tracy-Ann Oberman announced that she had agreed to pay Proudfoot substantial damages after falsely accusing him of antisemitism.

On 22 July 2022, Proudfoot announced his resignation as leader of the NIP "due to professional commitments".

Books

References

External links
 Philip Proudfoot's work at Google Scholar
 Philip Proudfoot at the Institute of Development Studies

Living people
1987 births
British socialists
English socialists
English politicians
People from County Durham
Leaders of political parties in the United Kingdom